The National Archives and Records Service is an institutional network, operating on a centralized and decentralized provincial basis under central government control. The National Archives and Records Service of South Africa was established by passing of the National Archives and Records Service of South Africa Act in 1996.

National Archives and Records Service Offices
 Head Office
 Bureau of Heraldry
 National Archives Repository
 National Film, Video and Sound Archives (South Africa)
Records Management and Information Systems

Provincial Archives Services 
Eastern Cape Provincial Archives (includes Mthatha Archives Repository, Port Elizabeth Archives Repository)
Free State Provincial Archives
Gauteng Provincial Archives
KwaZulu-Natal Provincial Archives (includes Durban Archives Repository, Pietermaritzburg Archives Repository, Ulundi Archives Repository)
Limpopo Provincial Archives Service
Mpumalanga Provincial Archives Service
Northern Cape Provincial Archives Service
 North West Provincial Archives and Records Services
 Western Cape Provincial Archives and Records Service

See also
 List of archives in South Africa
Archival platform
Iziko Museums
 National Library of South Africa
 Unesco Memory of the World Register – Africa

References

External links
National Archives and Records Service of South Africa 

Government of South Africa
History of South Africa
Archives in South Africa
1996 establishments in South Africa
South Africa
Organisations based in Pretoria